Marco Giuri (born 8 July 1988) is an Italian professional basketball player who last played for APU Udine of the Italian Serie A2 Basket second tier national league. He is a  combo guard.

Professional career
Marco Giuri began his professional basketball career with Virtus Siena in Serie B from the 2005–06 season. He played 27 matches of regular-season and two matches of play-out. For the following season he was with A.S. Junior Pallacanestro Casale, in Serie A2. Giuri played just eleven matches because he was loaned to Basket Vigevano again in Serie B.

From 2007 to 2009 he played 52 games in Serie A2 with Basket Livorno, and from 2009 to 2010 with Aurora Basket Jesi.

In December 2011 he was bought by Enel Brindisi in Serie A2. With the Brindisi based club, he won the LNP Cup and achieved the promotion to the LBA.

In 2012 he was with Basket Barcellona and in 2013 with Basket Ferentino. For the 2014–15 season in Serie A2 Giuri played with Scaligera Basket in Verona.

From 2015–16 season, Marco Giuri is a new player of Juvecaserta in LBA.

On 27 June 2017 Giuri signed a deal with New Basket Brindisi, where he came back after 5 years. On 6 July 2018 the Italian player left Brindisi after one year.

On 12 July 2018 Giuri signed a two-year deal with Reyer Venezia.

Italy National Team
Marco Giuri played with the U-20 Italy National Basketball Team from 2007 to 2008. In 2007 he took part to the FIBA Under-20 Championship, where he won the bronze medal.

Honours and titles

Team
Italian LNP Cup winner (2): 2012, 2015

References

External links
Lega Basket Serie A profile  Retrieved 17 January 2017
Legadue Basket profile  Retrieved 17 January 2017 
FIBA profile Retrieved 17 January 2017 
RealGM profile Retrieved 17 January 2017
EuroBasket.com profile Retrieved 17 January 2017

1988 births
Living people
A.S. Junior Pallacanestro Casale players
Basket Ferentino players
Basket Livorno players
Italian men's basketball players
Juvecaserta Basket players
Lega Basket Serie A players
New Basket Brindisi players
People from Brindisi
Point guards
Reyer Venezia players
Scaligera Basket Verona players
Shooting guards
Sportspeople from the Province of Brindisi